In enzymology, a carnitine dehydratase is an enzyme that catalyzes the chemical reaction

L-carnitine  4-(trimethylammonio)but-2-enoate + H2O

Hence, this enzyme has one substrate, L-carnitine, and two products, 4-(trimethylammonio)but-2-enoate and H2O.

This enzyme belongs to the family of lyases, specifically the hydro-lyases, which cleave carbon-oxygen bonds.  The systematic name of this enzyme class is L-carnitine hydro-lyase [4-(trimethylammonio)but-2-enoate-forming]. This enzyme is also called L-carnitine hydro-lyase.

References

 

EC 4.2.1
Enzymes of unknown structure